The Philip Green Memorial Trust (PGMT), was formed in 1985 by Cyril Paskin following the death of his close friend and fellow philanthropist, Philip Green.

Trust
Supported by a group of his close friends, they pledged to continue the good work Philip had begun in the East End of London, England, where he grew up. Philip's daughter Rosalind died at a very young age from meningitis, so it was decided that the majority of the Trust's efforts would be directed in helping children.

The primary source of funds comes from the annual Boxing Dinner which originally attracted around 250 people. Nearly two decades later it has increased that figure to nearly 1,000 people. The late Jeremy Beadle was a Trust Patron of The Philip Green Memorial Trust, and he annually hosted a quiz party along with Crown Prince Shwebomin of Burma to raise money for children, which has ventured north of the Border with a Boxing Night now being held in Glasgow as well.

Since the Trust's inception, it has distributed in excess of £2,000,000 to over 200 organisations and individuals. The major beneficiaries of the Trust's fundraising over the last few years have been the Paediatric Intensive Care Unit at St Mary's Hospital, London; the PACE Centre at Philip Green House in Buckinghamshire; Philip Green Memorial School in Dorset; Churchtown in Cornwall; the Grand Shaftesbury Run; Oakleigh School in Barnet and Richard House Children's Hospice in London's East End.

The Trust not only responds to the needs of large projects but to the daily exasperation of individuals and smaller organisations for whom a little money can make dreams come true. For instance, we provided a holiday for some Mencap children whose hard earned funds were stolen by thieves.

The Trust has no independent source of funds and relies fully on charitable donations.

Notable patrons 
 Jeremy Beadle
 Crown Prince Shwebomin
 Nicholas Ashley-Cooper, 12th Earl of Shaftesbury

References 

 Information was provided by Source: Philip Green Memorial Trust a Public Domain, GNU license.

External links
Philip Green Memorial Trust
PGMT Charity Fund Raising 
Out of tragedy grew a wonderful thing
Hoping to raise US$50,000 for children's charity, The Philip Green Memorial Trust
Philip Green Memorial School

1985 establishments in England
Charities based in London
Charities for disabled people based in England
Organizations established in 1985